Botterill is an unincorporated community in Howard County, Maryland, United States. A postal office operated from 15 July 1891 to 31 March 1896.

The neighborhood falls within the Patapsco River valley, 14 miles from Baltimore.

See also
Souder House

References

Unincorporated communities in Howard County, Maryland
Unincorporated communities in Maryland